Solenaspis is a monotypic genus of hoverfly from the family Syrphidae, in the order Diptera.

Species
Solenaspis beccarii Osten-Sacken, 1881

References

Monotypic Diptera genera
Eristalinae
Hoverfly genera
Diptera of Asia
Diptera of Australasia
Taxa named by Carl Robert Osten-Sacken